Vinni Dugary Triboulet (born 18 June 1999) is a Cameroonian professional footballer who plays as a midfielder for Bulgarian club Beroe Stara Zagora.

Club career
Triboulet made his professional debut with Nancy in a 2–1 Ligue 2 win over Orléans on 30 November 2018, and scored the game's first goal in his debut.

References

External links
 
 

1999 births
Living people
Footballers from Douala
Cameroonian footballers
French footballers
Cameroonian emigrants to France
French expatriate footballers
Association football midfielders
Ligue 2 players
Championnat National 3 players
Challenger Pro League players
AS Nancy Lorraine players
R.E. Virton players
Cameroonian expatriate sportspeople in Belgium
French expatriate sportspeople in Belgium
Expatriate footballers in Belgium